Ambatomainty Airport  is an airport serving the city of Ambatomainty, in the Melaky region of Madagascar.

References

Airports in Madagascar
Melaky